Sevenoaks is a local government district in west Kent, England. Its council is based in the town of Sevenoaks.

The district was formed on 1 April 1974 by the merger of Sevenoaks Urban District, Sevenoaks Rural District and part of Dartford Rural District.

Geography
The area is approximately evenly divided between buildings and infrastructure on the one hand and woodland or agricultural fields on the other.  It contains the upper valley of the River Darenth and some headwaters of the River Eden.

The vast majority of the district is covered by the Metropolitan Green Belt.

In terms of districts, it borders Dartford to the north, Gravesham to the northeast, Tonbridge and Malling to the east, briefly Tunbridge Wells to the southeast.  It also borders two which, equal to it, do not have borough status, the Wealden district of East Sussex to the south and the Tandridge district of Surrey to the southwest.  It borders the London Boroughs of Bromley and Bexley to the northwest.

In the 2011 Census, the district had a population of 114,893.

Council

The third tier of government within the district consists of the following town and parish councils:

Ash-cum-Ridley
Badgers Mount
Brasted
Chevening
Chiddingstone
Cowden
Crockenhill
Dunton Green
Edenbridge
Eynsford
Farningham
Fawkham
Halstead
Hartley
Hextable
Hever

Horton Kirby and South Darenth
Kemsing
Knockholt
Leigh
Otford
Penshurst
Riverhead
Seal
Sevenoaks (Town)
Sevenoaks Weald
Shoreham
Sundridge with Ide Hill
Swanley (Town)
Westerham
West Kingsdown

Elections and political control

The council consists of 54 elected councillors.

As of the 2019 election and subsequent by-elections, the political makeup of the council is:
 Administration
  Conservative (45)
 Other parties
 
  Hextable Independents (2)
  Independent (2)
  Labour (1)

Audit
In 2009 the Audit Commission named Sevenoaks District Council as one of the four best-run and most efficient councils in the country.

Premises
The council is based at the Council Offices on Argyle Road. The offices were built for the council on the site of a large house which had served as the offices of one of the council's predecessors, the Sevenoaks Urban District Council. The new building was formally opened on 3 March 1986.

Housing and architecture

The layout of the district is dual-centred:
A well-buffered suburban town itself, which spreads into suburban villages (St Johns, Riverhead, Dunton Green, Sevenoaks Weald).  
Swanley and smaller, equally buffered Hextable and Crockenhill within the M25 motorway.

In all areas low-rise dominates: the incidence of flats exceeding two storeys is rare.

The number of listed buildings in the district exceeds 150.  This includes 16 churches listed in the highest grading in the national listing system (Grade I).  Castles and English country houses of the wealthiest in society from the 16th to 18th centuries form part of this district.

Examples at Grade I include Knole House, Chartwell, Penshurst Place and Chevening House, most of which have their own produce-selling farms.  Older with original stone walls are Hever Castle with its -wooded island in a listed parkland.  A folly exists at Lullingstone Castle which is a reconstruction of its gatehouse and separate modern house.

See also
List of places of worship in Sevenoaks District

References 

 
Non-metropolitan districts of Kent